Debora Vaarandi (born Debora Trull; 1 October 1916 – 28 April 2007) was an Estonian writer, considered to be a leading literary figure in post-World War II Estonia. Many of her poems were set to music. Vaarandi was a recipient of the first Juhan Liiv Poetry Award, and was recognized with the Cultural Award of the Republic of Estonia for outstanding lifetime achievement.

Biography
Debora Vaarandi was born in Võru on 1 October 1916 to Julianus and Tamara Trull (née Ella). She grew up on the island of Saaremaa. Vaarandi studied language and literature at the University of Tartu. 

In 1936, she married Aadu Hint; the couple later divorced. She joined the Communist Party of Estonia in 1940. When the Germans invaded Estonia, she escaped to Russia, returning to Estonia in 1944. Although not trained as a journalist, she worked as editor in chief of the Communistic publication Sirbi ja Vasara. She was forced to resign that post after contracting tuberculosis.

In 1946, her first collection of poetry Põleva laotuse all ("Under a Blazing Sky") was published. Her work celebrates values such as the love of nature, the importance of family and the beauty of small things. Many of her poems have been set to music.

In 1952, she married writer Juhan Smuul. After 1977, she focused on translating works by Anna Akhmatova, Georg Trakl and Edith Södergran into Estonian. She was awarded the Order of the White Rose of Finland for her work in translating Finnish poetry into Estonian.

Awards and honors
1965, she received the first Juhan Liiv Poetry Award
2005, she was recognized with the Cultural Award of the Republic of Estonia for outstanding lifetime achievement.

Selected works 
 Unistaja aknal ("The Dreamer at the Window") (1959)
 Tuule valgel ("In the Light of the Wind") (1977)

References

External links

1916 births
2007 deaths
People from Võru
People from the Governorate of Livonia
Estonian women poets
Estonian translators
20th-century translators
20th-century Estonian poets
University of Tartu alumni
People's Writers of the Estonian SSR
Recipients of the Order of the White Star, 3rd Class
Order of the White Rose of Finland
Estonian women editors
Newspaper editors
Burials at Pärnamäe Cemetery